Four Feet in the Forest is an extended play (EP) by Australian singer songwriter Ziggy Alberts and released in May 2016. The EP was certified platinum in Australia in December 2019.

The EP explores social and environmental issues whilst highlighting Alberts' own journey and pressure to maintain health whilst developing his music career. Alberts told This is Radelaide "Every song on this record took months to write, till I got the subliminal/literal descriptive balance I envisioned. When I wrote the title track, 'Four Feet in the Forest', it was a real breakthrough song for me, personally - because I discovered a new maturity in creative description: and also began to lean less to writing about personal relationships with women in my life, and instead, emotion encapsulated in human form."

Track listing

Certifications

Release history

References

2016 EPs
Indie pop EPs
EPs by Australian artists
Ziggy Alberts albums